The 2008 Jerez Superleague Formula round was the sixth and final round of the inaugural Superleague Formula championship, with the races taking place on November 23, 2008. Eighteen football teams were represented on the grid, the same number of teams as there was at the previous four rounds. There were two driver changes before this round of the championship: James Walker replaced Enrico Toccacelo in the Borussia Dortmund car and Bertrand Baguette returned to the Al Ain cockpit replacing Dominick Muermans. Paul Meijer had been expected to return, however his injury from the previous round at Vallelunga kept him out. The meeting saw a second win for A.C. Milan and a first win for Borussia Dortmund. With a ninth in the first race coupled with other low placings for Liverpool F.C. and PSV Eindhoven, Beijing Guoan clinched the first Superleague Formula title. With a third in the final race, Beijing won the title with 413 points, some 66 points clear of PSV, and two points further back were Milan.

Report

Qualifying
After the random draw which split the eighteen-car field into two groups, the fastest four qualifiers from each progressed into the knockout stages to decide places 1 to 8 on the grid. Max Wissel (FC Basel 1893) and Bertrand Baguette (Al Ain) both missed out on the top eight, despite setting times faster than Group B 4th Borja García in the Sevilla FC car. As fastest drivers in their groups, Adrián Vallés (Liverpool F.C.) and Franck Perera (A.S. Roma) were expected to meet in the final, and sure enough, they did. Vallés became the first repeat polesitter in Superleague, with his 1:29.088 beating Perera's 1:29.328.

Race 1
At the start, Vallés led away from Perera, with Andy Soucek (Atlético Madrid) passing Tristan Gommendy (F.C. Porto) for third on the opening lap. On lap five, Wissel spun out of tenth place, and this allowed Craig Dolby's R.S.C. Anderlecht car into the top ten and towards the front, Soucek passed Perera for second place. Lap seven saw the first retirement, with Alessandro Pier Guidi pulling the Galatasaray S.K. car off with engine troubles. Lap eight saw the first pitstop - Antônio Pizzonia (SC Corinthians) pitting from sixth position. Vallés then brought in the Liverpool machine on lap nine, allowing Soucek through into the lead. Tuka Rocha retired on lap ten, having suddenly slowed the lap before in the CR Flamengo car, nearly taking out Davide Rigon's championship-leading Beijing Guoan car due to gearbox issues. Soucek continued to lead until his pitstop on lap 14 - except he didn't make it all the way to the garage. A spin on the way in, caused too much damage and Soucek retired. Vallés thus returned to lead by over 10 seconds from Robert Doornbos (A.C. Milan), Pizzonia, Gommendy and Duncan Tappy (Tottenham Hotspur). Fifteen of the sixteen laps remaining passed and Vallés looked untroubled. However, the engine in the Liverpool car died on the final lap, and Vallés fell from first to seventh, and with it went the championship hopes. Doornbos inherited victory ahead of Gommendy, Tappy, Dolby, Perera, García, Vallés, Yelmer Buurman (PSV Eindhoven), Rigon (which sealed the championship for Beijing Guoan), Baguette, Wissel, Pizzonia (who had been demoted due to pitting outside the window), Stamatis Katsimis (Olympiacos CFP), James Walker (Borussia Dortmund) and Ryan Dalziel (Rangers F.C.), who was seven laps down.

Race 2
Pier Guidi started from pole for the final race of the season, with Rocha alongside. Again, Soucek made up a place at the start, passing Walker for fourth. Pier Guidi's lead was up to nine seconds on lap six, when Soucek exited from fourth - spinning out to complete a miserable weekend. Lap eight saw a massive shunt, involving seventh-placed Katsimis and eighth-placed Wissel clashed in spectacular fashion - Wissel going over the back over the Olympiacos machine. Most teams started pitting on lap ten, with Pier Guidi pitting on lap twelve. Pizzonia took the lead for one lap before his pitstop, handing Dalziel the lead. During these stops, Vallés and Tappy both retired with gearbox failures. Pier Guidi returned to the lead, leading by some fourteen seconds from Walker, Pizzonia, Rigon and Rocha. However, Pier Guidi was struggling with his new set of tyres, and within five laps, the lead was only four seconds and was one second by lap 23. The pressure got to the Italian as he spun down to fourth at the entrance to the back straight. At the same time, Rocha exited fifth place with a spin into the barriers. That's how it finished, as Walker went on to claim the first victory for Dortmund, winning by 1.5 seconds from Pizzonia and Rigon, before a massive gap to the rest of the field led by Pier Guidi followed by Perera, Dalziel, Baguette, Dolby, Buurman, Doornbos, García and Gommendy.

Results

Qualifying
 In each group, the top four qualify for the quarter-finals.

Group A

Group B

Knockout stages

Grid

Race 1

* - Pizzonia penalised 30 seconds for pitting outside the compulsory window.

Race 2

* - Soucek penalised two places for causing an avoidable accident.

References

External links
 Official results from the Superleague Formula website

Jerez
Superleague Formula